Sargé-sur-Braye is a commune in the French department of Loir-et-Cher, administrative region of Centre-Val de Loire, France.

Geography 
The commune is bathed by the Braye and the Grenne rivers, which join here before leading as the Braye to the Loir. The town is a part of the canton of Le Perche. It is bordered to the north by Cormenon, to the south by Savigny-sur-Braye, to the east by Épuisay and to the west by Saint-Calais.

History 
Between 29 January and 8 February 1939, more than 3,100 Spanish refugees fleeing the collapse of the Spanish Republic under Franco, arrived in Loir-et-Cher. Faced with a lack of buildings to welcome them (the stud farm at Selles-sur-Cher had been used), 47 villages provide accommodation, including Sargé-sur-Braye. The refugees, essentially women and children, were subjected to a strict quarantine and vaccinated. Mail was limited. Supplies, though lacking variety and cooked the French way, were, however, assured. In the spring and summer, the refugees were regrouped at Bois-Brûlé (commune of Boisseau).

Population

Sights

 Église Saint-Martin. This church been listed since 1958 as a historic monument by the French Ministry of Culture. Dating originally from the 10th century, its present form is from 1549. There are traces of 14th century painted murals.
 Église Saint-Cyr, and its jacquemart.
 Château des Radrets has  been listed since 1977 as a monument historique. Parts of it date back to the 15th century; it was extensively altered in the 18th.
 Château de Montmarin has been listed since 1986 as a monument historique. Originally 17th century, it was altered in the 18th and 19th.
 Château du Fief Corbin
 Roussard quarry

See also
 Braye (river)
 Communes of the Loir-et-Cher department

References

External links
 
  
 

Communes of Loir-et-Cher